Daya Shankar may refer to:

 Daya Shankar (admiral) (1912-1993), Indian Navy admiral
 Daya Shankar (IRS officer)
 Daya Shankar (cricketer)